LaVell Boyd (born September 12, 1976) is a former professional American football player. The 6'3 218 WR Boyd then became the Head Coach of Seneca High School in Louisville, Ky

Early years
Boyd is a graduate of Doss High School and was the all-time leading wide receiver in (Louisville)Jefferson County history.  He later went on to the University of Louisville, where he finished his career number six on the all-time receptions list and helped lead his team to two bowl games. LaVell majored in Sociology and graduated from the University Of Louisville .

Professional career
LaVell Boyd played for the Cincinnati Bengals during the 2000 NFL season. In 2001 the Miami Dolphins where he was injured. In 2002 Boyd played with the Minnesota Vikings. The following season, Boyd played in NFL Europe with the Rhein Fire. In 2004, he played for the Arena Football League's Georgia Force.
Boyd coached at Shawnee High School in Louisville, Kentucky for part of the 2007 season. He was soon hired as the varsity football coach at Western High School in Shively, Kentucky.

References

LaVell led the Warriors to the 2010 KHSAA State Semifinals and had Western High School ranked as a top five team in the State for the 2011 season. Boyd received the 2010 Coach of the Year Award. Powerhouse Western High School won four straight District titles and played for three straight Regional Championships winning 2010.

External links
 LaVell Boyd player profile provided by the Georgia Force
 LaVell Boyd on radio provided by Old Goats Online

1976 births
Living people
People from Long Island
American football wide receivers
Players of American football from Louisville, Kentucky
Louisville Cardinals football players
Cincinnati Bengals players
Rhein Fire players
Georgia Force players
Doss High School alumni